Licínio Rangel (5 January 1936 – 16 December 2002) was a Brazilian who was consecrated a bishop without papal authorization in 1991 and later reconciled with the Holy See. He served as a bishop of the Catholic Church for about 11 months in 2002.

Biography
Rangel was born in Campos, Brazil, on 5 January 1936. He became a member of the Society of Saint Pius X.

He was ordained in 1991 in São Fidélis, a suburb of Rio de Janeiro, even as the Vatican was threatening those involved with excommunication.

He was consecrated a bishop without papal mandate on 28 July 1991 at São Fidélis in Rio de Janeiro by Bernard Tissier de Mallerais, assisted by Alfonso de Galarreta and Richard Williamson, all three members of the Society of St. Pius X who were themselves consecrated bishops without papal mandate and thus excommunicated from the Catholic Church. For his participation in this unauthorized rite of consecration he was excommunicated latae sententiae.

He succeeded Bishop Antônio de Castro Mayer in 1991 as superior of the Priestly Society of Saint John Mary Vianney, an association of priests in the diocese of Campos, Brazil.

On 15 August 2001, Rangel together with all 25 of the member priests reconciled with the Holy See. He addressed a letter to Pope John Paul II in which he confirmed his full submission to and communion with Rome. Pope John Paul responded on 25 December welcoming them into full communion with the Church and withdrawing any censures imposed on them. He also created the Personal Apostolic Administration of Saint John Mary Vianney on that day, with its territory matching that of the Diocese of Campos, and granted its members the right to celebrate Mass in the form instituted by Pope Pius V as amended by Pope John XXIII.

On 18 January 2002, Pope John Paul appointed Rangel its apostolic administrator and titular bishop of Zarna.

Rangel died in Campos of kidney cancer on 16 December 2002.

References

Additional sources
  This report anticipates the events of 18 January 2002.

1936 births
2002 deaths
Brazilian traditionalist Catholics
People temporarily excommunicated by the Catholic Church
Traditionalist Catholic bishops
Personal Apostolic Administration of Saint John Mary Vianney
Former members of the Society of Saint Pius X
People from Campos dos Goytacazes
20th-century Roman Catholic titular bishops
20th-century Roman Catholic bishops in Brazil